Nimdangi (also Romanized as Nīmdāngī and Nīm Dāngī) is a village in Dorudfaraman Rural District, in the Central District of Kermanshah County, Kermanshah Province, Iran. At the 2006 census, its population was 39, in 6 families.

References 

Populated places in Kermanshah County